Brenkert may refer to:

 Wayne Brenkert (1898–1979), American football player
 Brenkert Brenograph Jr.,  projector